Trichomycterus albinotatus is a species of pencil catfish endemic to Brazil, where it occurs in the Preto river, a tributary of the Paraíba do Sul river.

References

External links

albinotatus
Fish of South America
Fish of Brazil
Endemic fauna of Brazil
Taxa named by Wilson José Eduardo Moreira da Costa
Fish described in 1992